Garraway may refer to;

 Allan Garraway (1926–2014), British railway manager
 Annie Marie Watkins Garraway (born 1940), American mathematician
 Edward Garraway (1865–1932), Irish-born doctor and British colonial administrator
 Fitz Garraway (born 1947), Guyanese cricketer
 Henry Garraway (died 1646), English merchant and Lord Mayor of London
 Kate Garraway (born 1967), English television and radio presenter
 Ken Garraway, Canadian soccer player
 Levi Garraway (born 20th century), American oncologist
 Patrick Garraway (1883–1945), Guyanese cricketer
 Sandra M. Garraway (born 20th century), Canadian-American neuroscientist 
 Trevon Garraway (born 1984), Guyanese cricketer
 William Garraway (1617–1701), English MP